Murphy Lake may refer to:

United States

Colorado 
Haynach Lakes or Murphy Lakes in Grand County
Snowdrift Lake or Murphy Lakes in Grand County

Florida 
Lake Murphy (Florida)

Georgia 
Murphy Lakes (Georgia), Catoosa County
Lake Murphy (Colquitt County, Georgia)

Indiana 
J.C. Murphy Lake, Newton County

Louisiana 
Murphy Lake (Louisiana), Atchafalaya Basin

Michigan 
Murphy Lake (Berrien County, Michigan)
Rollway Lake, Newaygo County
Murphy Lake (Tuscola County, Michigan)

Minnesota 
Murphy Lake (Itasca County, Minnesota)
Tin Can Mike Lake, Lake County

Montana 
Murphy Lake (Lincoln County, Montana)

New Mexico 
Morphy Lake (Mora County, New Mexico)

New York 
Murphy Lake (New York)

Oregon 
Fish Lake (Marion County, Oregon)
Lake Murphy (Oregon), Lane County

Washington 
Lake Murphy (Washington), King County
Murphy Lakes (Washington), King County
Klinkhammer Lakes, Douglas County

Wisconsin 
Murphy Lake (Marinette County, Wisconsin)

Wyoming 
Murphy Lakes (Wyoming), Lincoln County

See also
Murphey Lake (disambiguation)
Lake Murphy (disambiguation)
Murphy Lakes (disambiguation)